James Alfred Cope-Christie was an architect in early Johannesburg and Rhodesia. He was born in England and educated in London and came to The Cape in 1894. Cope-Christie was articled to Charles Freeman in the Cape but really made his important contributions in the Rand and Rhodesia.

In 1904, the Johannesburg accountant Sir Charles Llewellyn Andersson enlisted the services of Sir Herbert Baker to design his Parktown home. Llewellyn Andersson rejected Baker's designs and in 1906 his unusual house was built according to Cope-Christie's designs. The house, Dolobran is in the eclectic style and is still in the family, now home to Sir Charles' great grandson. Cope Christie's other contributions in Johannesburg include a house in Yeoville and a house in Waverley.

References
 http://www.artefacts.co.za/main/Buildings/archframes.php?archid=297

British migrants to Cape Colony
Year of death missing
20th-century South African architects